Baloži is a town of Latvia situated in the Ķekava Municipality just 12 kilometres from the centre of Riga. In 2021, the city had a population of 6,746.

Baloži was founded soon after the Second World War; as a village at the time, it was developed for the nearby peat factory workers. The oldest part of the town is built in a Stalinist style. During the 1970s, territory of the village was expanded towards the A7 highway. During the 1980s this part was built as a modern residential district and called Titurga. In 1991 Baloži received town rights. After the Latvian administrative territorial reform of 2009, Baloži became part of Ķekava Municipality and thus became one of the few Latvian towns which are not municipal centres. Baloži is defined by Latvian law as a part of the region of Vidzeme.

Rail network 
Baloži had a small rail network. It was 28 kilometres long and was built to transport peat from the local factory.

See also
List of cities in Latvia

References 

Towns in Latvia
Populated places established in 1991
1991 establishments in Latvia
Ķekava Municipality
Vidzeme